Oshik Levi (born April 7, 1944) is an Israeli singer, actor, and entertainer.

Biography
Oshik Levi started his career in the late 1960s as a rock singer, first in the group Shlishiyat Ha-Te'omim (Hebrew: שלישיית התאומים, lit. "The Twins Trio") and then as a solo artist, gaining fame for such songs as Ha-Ballada la-shoter Azulay ("The Ballad of Officer Azoulay" – the theme song for Ephraim Kishon's film Ha-Shoter Azoulay,(released as "The Policeman" in English language markets), Hoze Lech Brach ("Seer, go and flee" – based on a verse in the biblical Book of Amos), and Yonatan Sa Ha-Baita ("Yonatan, Go Home" by Yonatan Geffen).

In the 1980s, Levi starred in the Israeli children's show Bli Sodot, alongside Hanny Nahmias, Nathan Nathanson and Hanan Goldblatt.

He is probably best remembered by American audiences for his uncredited role as the Good Thief on the cross in the 1979 Jesus Film. 

In 2005, a song on the debut album by the British Band Mattafix, 11:30, featured a sampling of the opening chords of Hoze Lech Brach. Mattafix members claim they have listened to Israeli rock of the 1960s and 1970s, and that it influenced their music. In June 2006, Mattafix performed in Tel Aviv as part of their European tour, and performed with Levi, singing a combined version of 11:30 and Hoze Lech Brach.

See also
Israeli television
Culture of Israel

References

1944 births
Living people
20th-century Israeli male singers
Israeli male film actors
Israeli male television actors